5 Steps to Danger is a 1957 American film noir crime film directed, produced, and co–written by Henry S. Kesler. It stars Ruth Roman and Sterling Hayden, with a cast that also included  Werner Klemperer, Richard Gaines, Charles Davis, Jeanne Cooper, and Peter Hansen. 5 Steps to Danger was based on the novel The Steel Mirror by Donald Hamilton.

Plot
John Emmett, an American everyman, is on a fishing and hunting trip when his car breaks down. He is offered a ride by a stranger, Ann Nicholson, who is driving to Santa Fe and asks him to take turns behind the wheel.

During a stopover a woman identifying herself as a nurse takes John aside in a diner and says she has been following them because Ann is an escaped mental patient of a Dr. Frederick Simmons. And although he is not sure what to believe, John begins to doubt Ann when two policemen attempt to arrest them, claiming to be investigating a murder in Los Angeles.

John and Ann slip away. He demands the truth, whereupon Ann says she is an ex-German citizen who stumbled upon a government plot and is in possession of valuable scientific transcripts embedded on a small cosmetic mirror. In order to prevent Simmons from having Ann committed to a mental institution against her will, John asks Ann to marry him, while also declaring his love for her. They wed in a small town and then continue their journey to find the scientist who wrote the transcripts. The chase ends in a confrontation between Simmons, who is actually a Soviet spy, and his accomplices versus FBI and CIA agents, who verify Ann's story. Ann and John enjoy their honeymoon on the fishing trip John had originally planned.

Cast
 Ruth Roman as Ann Nicholson
 Sterling Hayden as John Emmett
 Werner Klemperer as Dr. Simmons
 Richard Gaines as Dean Brant
 Charles Davis as Kirk
 Jeanne Cooper as Helen Bethke
 Peter Hansen as Karl Plesser
 Karl Ludwig Lindt as Kissel (as Karl Lindt)
 John Mitchum as Deputy 
 John Frederick as Sheriff (as John Merrick)

Reception

Critical response
The New York Times wrote that the film was "a rather lax and familiar melodrama about Communist espionage in this country, offers two real jolts. The climax, and this may be an unfair revelation, has a known subversive given some leeway inside a vital guided missile plant. Secondly, the place seems about as inaccessible as a drive-in restaurant. [...] The responsibility, or irresponsibility, must be shouldered by Henry S. Kesler, who handled the screenwriting, the directing and producing, and none of it very well."

Release
5 Steps to Danger was released in theatres on January 30, 1957.

References

Sources

External links

1957 films
Film noir
Cold War spy films
1950s English-language films
American road movies
American anti-communist propaganda films
American crime thriller films
1950s crime thriller films
American black-and-white films
Films scored by Paul Sawtell
1950s American films